Atamanovka may refer to:
Atamanovka, Zabaykalsky Krai, an urban-type settlement in Zabaykalsky Krai, Russia
Atamanovka, Republic of Bashkortostan, a village (selo) in the Republic of Bashkortostan, Russia
Atamanovka, name of several other rural localities in Russia